Edith Josie  (December 8, 1921 – January 31, 2010) was a Canadian writer, best known as a longtime columnist for the Whitehorse Star. Her column, titled Here Are the News, concerned life in the small community of Old Crow, Yukon, and was syndicated to newspapers around the world. Her writing style was noted for its offbeat smalltown charm, not always conforming to conventional notions of English grammar and spelling but instead reflective of the informal way she spoke as a non-native speaker of English:

A Gwich'in, Josie was born in Eagle, Alaska, and moved to Old Crow at age 16. She earned a living selling animal skins, which her father had taught her at an early age how to trap and prepare. In her later years, Josie contributed to a community website, oldcrow.ca. She was the subject of a story, "Everybody Sure Glad," by Dora Jane Hamblin in Life magazine in 1965. In 1995 Josie was made a member of the Order of Canada. The National Aboriginal Achievement Awards, now the Indspire Awards, honoured Josie for her achievements in arts in 2000. In 2019, a bronze bust of Josie was created in her honour and displayed in Old Crow.

References

External links
Sample "Here Are the News" columns, republished by the Edmonton Journal

1921 births
2010 deaths
Alaskan Athabaskan people
American emigrants to Canada
Canadian columnists
Canadian women journalists
First Nations journalists
First Nations women writers
Gwich'in people
Members of the Order of Canada
Writers from Yukon
Canadian women columnists
Indspire Awards
20th-century Canadian non-fiction writers
20th-century Canadian women writers
20th-century First Nations writers
Canadian women non-fiction writers